Tony Arbolino (born 3 August 2000) is an Italian motorcycle racer.

Career

Moto3 World Championship

Sic58 Squadra Corse (2017)
He was signed up to race in the Moto3 World Championship for the SIC58 Squadra Corse team for 2017.
He scored two points in the whole season, ending up 34th in the standings.

Snipers Team (2018–2020)

A year later he raced for the Marinelli Snipers Team, scoring his first pole position at the second race of the season, at the Termas de Rio Hondo. He scored points in many occasions, including another pole position at Valencia. He finished 18th in the standings.

He continued another year with VNE Snipers Team, scoring his first podium in Argentina. He then made his first career win in Mugello, and also his second later in Assen. He finished on the podium on many other times, ending fourth in the standings. In 2020, Arbolino secured the second place in the 2020 Moto3 World Championship with several podiums to his name and a victory in the penultimate round in Valencia at the 2020 Valencian Community motorcycle Grand Prix.

Moto2 World Championship

Liqui Moly Intact GP (2021)
In 2021 Arbolino made the switch to the Moto2 class with Liqui Moly Intact GP. His season was slightly inconsistent, achieving four top ten finishes through out the year with a personal best of fourth achieved at the 2021 French motorcycle Grand Prix, finishing 14th in the standings. For 2022 Arbolino moved to Elf Marc VDS Racing Team with hopes for even better results than in 2021.

Elf Marc VDS Racing Team (2022–)
Arbolino started the year in great shape with debut front row achieved at the 2022 Qatar motorcycle Grand Prix, just to take his debut victory in the intermediate class at the 2022 Motorcycle Grand Prix of the Americas. Arbolino scored 3 wins and 5 podiums throughout the year, the Italian finished the year sitting fourth in the standings.

Career statistics

FIM CEV Moto3 Junior World Championship

Races by year
(key) (Races in bold indicate pole position; races in italics indicate fastest lap)

Grand Prix motorcycle racing

By season

By class

Races by year
(key) (Races in bold indicate pole position; races in italics indicate fastest lap)

 Half points awarded as less than two thirds of the race distance (but at least three full laps) was completed.

References

External links

2000 births
Living people
Italian motorcycle racers
Moto3 World Championship riders
Sportspeople from Milan
Moto2 World Championship riders